Danièle Nyst (1942 – 3 April 1998) was a Belgian video artist.

She was born in Liège and studied at the Academy of Fine Arts in Madrid. She was music programmer at RTBF (Radio Television Belge-Francaise). Nyst worked in collaboration with her husband Jacques Louis Nyst from 1983 to 1995. The couple was based in Sprimont.

She died in a car accident in  Sprimont in 1998.

References 

1942 births
1998 deaths
Belgian video artists
Artists from Liège